is a dam in Nanto, Toyama Prefecture and Shirakawa, Gifu Prefecture, Japan. It is named for the Sakaigawa River (a tributary of the Shō River), upon which it is built. It was commissioned in June 1993.

References

Dams in Gifu Prefecture
Dams completed in 1993
Dams on the Shō River
Hydroelectric power stations in Japan